Charles Belcher may refer to:

 Charles Frederic Belcher (1876–1970), Australian lawyer, author, British colonial jurist and amateur ornithologist
 Charles Belcher (actor) (1872–1943), American film actor
 Charles Belcher (cricketer) (1872–1938), English cricketer